This is a list of television programmes that are either currently being broadcast or have previously been broadcast or will be broadcast soon on TVN in Poland.

Currently broadcast by TVN

News
Fakty TVN (1997–present)
Prognoza pogody (1997–present)
Sport (1997–present)
Superwizjer (2000–present)
Uwaga! (2003–present)

Soap opera
Na Wspólnej (2003–present)

Drama
Przepis na życie
True Law

Docu-crime
Detektywi (2005–2012)
W11 - Wydział Śledczy (2004–2014)

Reality/variety
Mam talent! (2008–2019)
Szymon Majewski Show (2005–2010)
Taniec z gwiazdami (2005–2010)
Wydanie II poprawione
You Can Dance: Po prostu tańcz! (2007–2016)

Game shows
Milionerzy, format of Who Wants to Be a Millionaire? (1999–2003; 2008–present)

Talkshow
Kuba Wojewódzki (2006–present)
Rozmowy w Toku (2000–present)
Teraz My! (2005–present)

Morning program
Dzień dobry TVN (2005–present)

Entertainment news programmes
Co za tydzień (2001–present)
Dancing with the Stars - Behind The Scenes (2005–present)
Wydanie drugie poprawione

Sports
Motoszoł (2008–present)
Siłacze (2001–present)

Formerly broadcast by TVN

Drama
39 i pół (2008–2009)
 (2004)
Kryminalni (2004–2008)
Magda M. (2005–2007)
Miasteczko (1999–2000)
Naznaczony (2009)
Odwróceni (2007)
Teraz albo nigdy! (2008–2009)
Twarzą w twarz (2007–2009)
Usta Usta (2010-2011, since 2020)

Sitcom
Anioł Stróż (2005)
Caméra Café (2004)
Hela w opałach (2006)
Ja, Malinowski (1999)
Kasia i Tomek (2002–2003)
Król przedmieścia (2002)
Niania (2005–2009)
Rodziców nie ma w domu (1997–1998)

Documentary
Agencja
Battle of Britain
Cela
Chicago
Detektyw
Granice
Jarmark Europa
Kryminalne gry
Miasto zbrodni
Na ratunek (1997–2002)
Nauka jazdy
Sąd rodzinny (2008–2012)
Sędzia Anna Maria Wesołowska (2006–2012)
Usterka
Wielkie ucieczki

Entertainment
Ale plama
Ananasy z mojej klasy
Ciao Darwin
Co za noc
Dla ciebie wszystko
Droga do Gwiazd
Druga twarz
Gorący patrol
Ibisz, gwiazdy, muzyka
Jak łyse konie
Magazyn Orange Ekstraklasa (2005–2008)
Mamy Cię! (2004–2005)
Maraton uśmiechu
Mini Playback Show
Misja Martyna
Moja krew
Projekt plaża
Sextet
Studio Tramwaj
Studio Złote Tarasy (2007)
To było grane
Trafiony zatopiony
Trzy serca
Twój problem, nasza głowa
VIVA Polska!
Zmagania miast
Zostań gwiazdą

Cooking
Co ty wiesz o gotowaniu, czyli Linda w kuchni
Gotuj z Kuroniem
Kuroń raz
Pascal express
Wielka niespodzianka Klaudiusza

Magazines
Adopcje (2002–2003)
Cyfra
Dom pełen pomysłów
Europejska corrida
Fakty, ludzie, pieniądze
Fenomen milionerów
Firma
Kto was tak urządził?
Ładny dom
Modelki
Nie do wiary (1997–2007)
Noktowizjer
Pepsi Chart Show
Polska na weekend
Tele plotki
Zielono mi

Game shows
Dzieciaki z klasą (2004-2005)
Oko za oko
We dwoje (2002-2003)
The Weakest Link (2004-2006)

Interactive game shows
 Apetyt na kasę (2009–2010)
 Czas to pieniądz
 Fabryka Gry (2006–2008)
 Galaktyka 
 Graj o raj (2005–06)
 Granie na śniadanie (2009–2010)
  (2010)
 Hej-nał show (2008)
 Kropek
 Łamisłówka (2002)
 No to gramy (2006)
 Nocne granie (2009)
 Nocne igraszki (2004–2007)
 O co chodzi?
 Po co spać, jak można grać (2010)
 Rozbij bank (2008)
 Salon gier (2005–2006)
 Salon Gry (2009)
 Szybka forsa (2004)
 Tele Gra (2002–2004)
 Trele morele (2003)
 Wrzuć na luz (2008)
 Wszystko albo nic
 Wykręć numer (2004–2007)
 Zwariowana forsa

Talkshow
Dwururka (2006)
Ibisekcja
Na tropie agenta
Pod napięciem (1998-2006)
Urzekła mnie twoja historia
Wybacz mi

Reality/variety
 Big Brother (2001-2002)
 Clever - widzisz i wiesz (2007–2008)
 Jestem jaki jestem
 Kawaler do wzięcia
 The Mole (2000-2002)
 Pascal: Po prostu gotuj! (September 2004-December 2009)
 Superniania (2006-2007)
 Wyprawa Robinson (2004)

News
 600 sekund życia
 Dama Pik
 Extrawizjer
 Jak pies z kotem
 Kawa na ławę (2006-September 2010)
 Konferencja prasowa
 Kropka nad i
 Miller, czyli kto?
 Najsztub pyta
 Prześwietlenie
 Sto dni premiera
 Telewizjer
 Wizjer TVN
 Wprost TV

Sports
Adrenalina
Boxing
Ko czy OK
Puchar Lata – Gdynia (2003)
Raz kozie śmierć
Skok do Europy
Slalom Gwiazd
Windsurfing Era Cup

Motoring
Auto-auto
Automaniak
Automaniak Max

Foreign programmes
Alarm für Cobra 11 – Die Autobahnpolizei
America's Next Top Model
Balls of Steel
Band of Brothers
Beverly Hills, 90210
Californication
Chuck
Close to Home
The Closer 
Cold Case
Covert Affairs
Dexter
The Drew Carey Show
Eleventh Hour
ER
The Event
The Following
The Forgotten
The Fresh Prince of Bel-Air
Friends
Fringe
Full House
Ghost Whisperer
Gossip Girl
Heartbreak High
House M.D.
Human Target
Karen Sisco
Kung Fu: The Legend Continues
Ladette to Lady
Mad Men
Melrose Place
Men in Trees
Mayday
Medical Investigation
Medicopter 117 – Jedes Leben zählt
The Mentalist
Mercy
Monk
Nash Bridges
NCIS
NCIS: Los Angeles 
Nikki
Nip/Tuck
Northern Exposure
The O.C.
The Omar Series
One Tree Hill
Person of Interest
Presidio Med
Pushing Daisies
Rizzoli & Isles
Saving Grace
Sex and the City
Six Feet Under
Smallville
The Sopranos
Supernatural
Surface
Taken
Terminator: The Sarah Connor Chronicles
Trauma
Two and a Half Men
United States of Tara
V
The Vampire Diaries
Veronica Mars
The Whole Truth
The Wire
Without a Trace

Telenovelas
Las Vías del Amor
Marina
Mujer de Madera
Pasión De Gavilanes
Rubí

References

TVN
TVN (Polish TV channel) original programming